Hasan Ferda Güley (1916 – 17 November 2008) was a Turkish military officer, politician, and former government minister.

Hasan Ferda was born in Aybastı ilçe (district) of Ordu Province, Ottoman Empire in 1916 . He graduated from the Turkish Military Academy and the Faculty of Letters of Istanbul University.

After serving in the Turkish Military Academy as a teacher, he joined the Republican People's Party (CHP), and was elected into the 11th parliament as a deputy of Ordu Province. He kept his seat in the 12th, 13th, 14th and the 15th Parliament of Turkey as well as the Constituent Assembly of Turkey. In his last term in the parliament, he was appointed Minister of Transport during the 37th government of Turkey serving between 26 January 1974 and 17 November 1974.

Hasan Ferda Güley died in Istanbul on 17 November 2008. He was laid to rest in Cebeci Asri Cemetery in Ankara.

Güley was married and father of four.

References

1916 births
People from Aybastı
Turkish Military Academy alumni
Istanbul University alumni
Turkish military officers
Republican People's Party (Turkey) politicians
Deputies of Ordu
Members of the 11th Parliament of Turkey
Members of the Constituent Assembly of Turkey
Members of the 12th Parliament of Turkey
Members of the 13th Parliament of Turkey
Members of the 14th Parliament of Turkey
Members of the 15th Parliament of Turkey
Members of the 37th government of Turkey
Ministers of Transport and Communications of Turkey
2008 deaths
Burials at Cebeci Asri Cemetery